Night Sky (née Lightyears) is an American science fiction drama streaming television series created by Holden Miller for Amazon Studios and Legendary Television. It stars Sissy Spacek and J. K. Simmons as a couple who possess a chamber leading to another planet. Chai Hansen, Adam Bartley, Julieta Zylberberg, Rocío Hernández, Kiah McKirnan, Beth Lacke, Stephen Louis Grush, and Cass Buggé co-star. The series was shot in Illinois, United States, and Jujuy Province, Argentina.

Night Sky was released on May 20, 2022, on Amazon Prime Video. In July 2022, the series was canceled after one season.

Premise
An elderly couple living in the Midwest discover under their land lies a device that can teleport them to a chamber that looks out onto the barren landscape and star-filled sky of another world.

Cast
 Sissy Spacek as Irene York, a retired English teacher in Farnsworth, Illinois, who is Franklin's wife and Denise's paternal grandmother
 J. K. Simmons as Franklin York, a former woodworker, who is Irene's husband of over 50 years and Denise's paternal grandfather
 Chai Hansen as Jude, an enigmatic young man who appears suddenly by the portal and becomes a "caretaker" for the Yorks. It is revealed that he has escaped from the Cult of Caerul.
 Adam Bartley as Byron, the Yorks' new nosy and socially awkward neighbor 
 Julieta Zylberberg as Stella, a mother in Argentina on a secretive mission to find an elusive man. She is a member of the Cult of Caerul.
 Rocío Hernández as Toni, Stella's isolated and impulsive daughter
 Piotr Adamczyk as Cornelius, the mysterious man in charge of sending Stella and Nick on missions. He is a high-ranking member of the Cult of Caerul.
 Kiah McKirnan as Denise, an MBA student, who is the Yorks' granddaughter
 Beth Lacke as Chandra, a former student of Irene, who works as a caretaker despite her kleptomania
 Sonya Walger as Hannah, a former member of the cult who now heads the Fallen World, an organization fighting it
 Stephen Louis Grush as Nick, a pugnacious member of the Cult of Caerul who at first aids Stella in her mission
 Angus O'Brien as Michael, the Yorks' deceased son and Denise's father, who died by suicide when Denise was five years old.
 Cass Buggé as Jeanine, Byron's wife

Episodes

Production
Night Sky is an American co-production between Amazon Studios and Legendary Television, created by Holden Miller and Daniel C. Connolly. The project was given a series order on October 21, 2020. Sissy Spacek and Ed O'Neill joined the cast in March 2021. O'Neill left the show the following month and was replaced by J. K. Simmons. Chai Hansen, Adam Bartley, Julieta Zylberberg, Rocío Hernández, and Kiah McKirnan were added to the cast as series regulars in May 2021. Principal photography began in June 2021 in the state of Illinois. Notable filming locations include the city of Woodstock, Cinespace Film Studios in Chicago, and the villages of Frankfort, Wauconda, and Island Lake. In August 2021, it was reported Beth Lacke, Stephen Louis Grush, and Cass Buggé would star in recurring roles. Filming was scheduled to conclude in October 2021. 

On July 5, 2022, Amazon Prime Video canceled the series after one season due to the view count unable to justify production costs. Preproduction on a prospective second season was set to begin in September 2022.

Release
The series was released on May 20, 2022, on Amazon Prime Video.

Reception
The review aggregator website Rotten Tomatoes reported an 73% approval rating with an average rating of 6.4/10, based on 45 critic reviews. The website's critics consensus reads, "Night Sky reaches for the stars when it really should have settled on a feature length finish, but the combined supernova of J.K. Simmons and Sissy Spacek shines bright." Metacritic, which uses a weighted average, assigned a score of 66 out of 100 based on 18 critics, indicating "generally favorable reviews".

References

External links
 
 
 Official pilot screenplay

English-language television shows
2020s American drama television series
2020s American science fiction television series
2022 American television series debuts
2022 American television series endings
Amazon Prime Video original programming
Television shows filmed in Illinois
Television series by Amazon Studios
Television series by Legendary Television